Mihera Bint Abboud was a 19th-century Sudanese female poet and warrior, celebrated as a heroine for her attitude of resistance to the Turco-Egyptian invasion of Sudan.

Mihera Bint Abboud was the daughter of the leader of the Shaigiya people in Northern Sudan. After Muhammad Ali Pasha's troops had invaded Sudan in 1820, rumors of their power made the Shaigiya men reluctant to fight the invaders. Mihera is said to have mounted her camel, dressed in men's clothes and carrying a sword, and declared to the men: "Here we are; our clothes are for you". After her performance had roused the men to battle, Mihera composed this verse to celebrate their courage:
    Today our men all on their horses
    In front of them their commander
    On his beautiful horse struts. 
    Our men are like lions when they roar
    Oh, fool Pasha, just let your chickens go away.

Shaigiya swords and lances were no match for Egyptian firearms, and the Egyptian troops continued their conquest of the Sudan. 

However, as a heroine from Sudanese history, the example of Mihera Bint Abboud has been an inspiration to women participating in anti-colonial politics in the Sudan, as well as in the 2019–2020 Sudanese protests.

See also 
 History of Turkish Sudan

References

Year of birth unknown
Year of death unknown
19th-century deaths
19th-century Sudanese people
Women warriors
African warriors
19th-century Sudanese poets
Sudanese women poets